Gene October  is a British singer and songwriter who was a formative figure in London's punk rock movement in the late 1970s.

Music career
In 1976, October was involved in the creation of The Roxy when he suggested to the management of Chaguaramas, a central London nightclub, that they convert it into a centre for the new punk rock scene to coalesce. Later, he briefly managed a club named Revolution No.9 and was employed as an A&R man for Miles Copeland III's IRS Records.

October was the singer/frontman of the original London band Chelsea, which formed in late 1976, also featuring William Broad on guitar and Tony James on bass. The band's repertoire at this time consisted primarily of cover versions of 1960s songs by the Beatles and Rolling Stones, but they broke up after only a few weeks and a handful of live performances due to a clash of personalities. Broad, James, and drummer John Towe left October onstage during a live gig, eventually forming Generation X. In early 1977, October assembled a new line-up of Chelsea, which released numerous records and sustained many personnel changes.

From the mid-1980s to the 1990s, he was a solo artist, releasing two singles and a 1995 album titled Life and Struggle. Since 1999, he has intermittently recorded and toured with Chelsea, including their 40th anniversary tour in 2016.

October also acted in two films produced and directed by Derek Jarman. In Jubilee, he played the character Happy Days, and in Caravaggio, he appeared as a fruit-eating model.

Solo artist discography

Albums
 Life and Struggle (Receiver Records, 1995)

Singles
 "Suffering in the Land" (Illegal Records, 1983)
 "Don't Quit" (Slipped Discs, 1984)

References

External links
 
 Official Chelsea website

Year of birth missing (living people)
Living people
English male singers
English punk rock singers